HMS Colne was a Thornycroft type  ordered by the Royal Navy under the 1903–1904 Naval Estimates.  Named after the River Colne in eastern England, north east of London, she was the first ship to carry this name in the Royal Navy.

Construction
She was laid down on 21 March 1904 at the John I. Thornycroft & Company shipyard at Chiswick and launched on 21 May 1905.  She was completed in July 1905.  Her original armament was to be the same as the Turleback torpedo boat destroyers that preceded her.  In 1906 the Admiralty decided to upgrade the armament by landing the five 6-pounder naval guns and shipping three 12-pounder 8 hundredweight (cwt) guns.  Two would be mounted abeam at the fo'c's'le break and the third gun would be mounted on the quarterdeck.

Pre-War
After commissioning she was assigned to the East Coast Destroyer Flotilla of the 1st Fleet and based at Harwich.

On 11 April 1907, Colne and the destroyer  collided in the Channel, badly damaging both ships.

On 27 April 1908 the Eastern Flotilla departed Harwich for live fire and night manoeuvres.  During these exercises  rammed and sank , then damaged .

In 1909–1910 she was assigned to China Station.

On 30 August 1912 the Admiralty directed all destroyer classes were to be designated by alpha characters starting with the letter 'A'.  The ships of the River class were assigned to the E class.  After 30 September 1913, she was known as an E class destroyer and had the letter 'E' painted on the hull below the bridge area and on either the fore or aft funnel.

First World War
She deployed with China Squadron to Tsingtao to blockade the German base. On 24 November 1914, after the Japanese declaration of war she returned to Hong Kong.

HMS Colne was not hit and suffered no casualties during this friendly fire incident.

On 25 April 1915 under the command of Commander C. Seymour, she supported the landings at ANZAC Cove.

On 25 May 1915 she provided fire support for ground forces during their capture of some Turkish outpost trenches.

Disposition
In 1919 she returned to Home waters, was paid off and laid up in reserve awaiting disposal.  On 4 November 1919 she was sold to J.H. Lee for breaking at Dover.

She was awarded the Battle Honour "Dardanelles 1915–1916" for her service.

Pennant Numbers
It is not known if she was assigned a pennant number as no record has been found.

References

Bibliography
 
 
 
 
 
 
 

 

River-class destroyers
World War I destroyers of the United Kingdom
1905 ships
Ships built by John I. Thornycroft & Company